Latasha Nashay Byears (born August 12, 1973) is a former American professional women's basketball player.  She played in the WNBA for the Sacramento Monarchs, the Los Angeles Sparks, the Washington Mystics, and for the Houston Comets.  Byears ranked eighth all-time in the WNBA in field goal percentage (.514) and was among the top 10 rebounders in the league's history as of 2003.

Nicknamed "Tot", Byears usually played the position of power forward. However, the openly lesbian Byers became associated with legal controversy outside of her basketball career.

College years 
Born in Memphis, Tennessee, Byears grew up in Millington, Tennessee and went to high school in nearby Arlington, Tennessee. Afterwards, Byears played two years in Northeastern Oklahoma A&M, located in Miami, Oklahoma.  She later transferred to DePaul University in Chicago, where she averaged 22.8 points and 11.7 rebounds per game during the 1995–1996 season, a performance that earned her a first team All-American. On 23 January 2011 Byears inducted to DePaul Athletic Hall of Fame.

WNBA career 
Despite not being selected at the first WNBA Draft, the Sacramento Monarchs invited Byears to their training camp prior to their inaugural season in 1997.  Byears then starred for the Monarchs for the next four seasons.

After the 2000 season ended, Byears was traded to the Los Angeles Sparks, where she was a crucial part of a championship win for the team. She was arrested on March 1, 2001 for driving under the influence of marijuana. Because of this, she had to miss the first match of the 2001 regular season due to a suspension. On July 11, 2002, she fought Michelle M. Marciniak on the court in a game against the Seattle Storm. On July 12, 2002, the WNBA fined her $1,000 and banned her for 2 matches. However, following a June 5, 2003 Sparks game, Byears and three men unconnected to the Sparks were investigated for an alleged rape of a WNBA player. Byears was cut by the Sparks a few days after the alleged incident.  Four months later, in light of Kobe Bryant's rape allegations and how the Los Angeles Lakers, who owned the Sparks at the time, supported Bryant during the controversy. Byears sued the Lakers, accusing the team of double standard. Byears felt that it was unfair that she was never charged and was cut; Bryant's case was settled, yet he still continued to play and represent the team in media.  The criminal proceedings were closed in August 2005 due to insufficient evidence, and Byears' lawsuit against the Lakers was settled months later.  Shortly after settling the lawsuit, Byears returned to the WNBA after a two-year absence, signing with the Mystics.

In 2007, Byears signed a free agent contract with the Houston Comets. She was briefly waived in 2008, before being re-signed. The Comets organization folded at the end of the 2008 season. Byears, as an unrestricted free agent, was not eligible for selection by another team in the resulting dispersal draft, and was not signed by another team prior to or during the 2009 season.

Overseas career 

In October 2001 Byears joined the EuroLeague final four participant and Hungarian National League champion MiZo-Pécsi VSK. She played only two matches, on 15 November 2001 travel back the United States.

In November 2006 Byears joined the Bulgarian team of CSKA Sofia. They won the Bulgarian Championships and Bulgarian Cup.

Byears played for Leszno in Poland during the 2008–09 WNBA off-season.

Career statistics

Regular season

|-
| style="text-align:left;"|1997
| style="text-align:left;"|Sacramento
| 28 || 19 || 23.4 || .459 || .200 || .739 || 6.9 || 1.7 || 1.4 || 0.3 || 2.4 || 8.7
|-
| style="text-align:left;"|1998
| style="text-align:left;"|Sacramento
| 30 || 26 || 27.6 || .453 || .222 || .663 || 6.6 || 1.0 || 1.4 || 0.4 || 2.4 || 14.2
|-
| style="text-align:left;"|1999
| style="text-align:left;"|Sacramento
| 32 || 32 || 22.0 || .537 || .000 || .565 || 5.3 || 1.0 || 1.1 || 0.2 || 1.9 || 9.2
|-
| style="text-align:left;"|2000
| style="text-align:left;"|Sacramento
| 32 || 0 || 16.3 || .524 || .500 || .612 || 3.8 || 0.7 || 0.9 || 0.2 || 1.1 || 5.7
|-
| style="text-align:left;background:#afe6ba;"|2001†
| style="text-align:left;"|Los Angeles
| 32 || 13 || 23.1 || style="background:#D3D3D3" |.602° || .333 || .577 || 5.7 || 0.9 || 1.3 || 0.4 || 1.2 || 9.3
|-
| style="text-align:left;background:#afe6ba;"|2002†
| style="text-align:left;"|Los Angeles
| 26 || 5 || 18.7 || .618 || .000 || .566 || 5.4 || 0.5 || 0.7 || 0.2 || 0.8 || 7.0
|-
| style="text-align:left;"|2003
| style="text-align:left;"|Los Angeles
| 5 || 0 || 14.4 || .400 || .000 || .727 || 4.2 || 0.4 || 0.0 || 0.4 || 0.4 || 5.6
|-
| style="text-align:left;"|2006
| style="text-align:left;"|Washington
| 26 || 0 || 12.8 || .449 || .000 || .800 || 3.3 || 0.4 || 0.5 || 0.1 || 1.4 || 4.3
|-
| style="text-align:left;"|2007
| style="text-align:left;"|Houston
| 30 || 0 || 10.9 || .591 || .000 || .583 || 2.5 || 0.5 || 0.8 || 0.2 || 1.2 || 5.0
|-
| style="text-align:left;"|2008
| style="text-align:left;"|Houston
| 11 || 0 || 4.2 || .471 || .000 || .667 || 1.1 || 0.1 || 0.3 || 0.0 || 0.1 || 1.6
|-
| style="text-align:left;"|Career
| style="text-align:left;"|10 years, 4 teams
| 252 || 95 || 18.7 || .515 || .233 || .635 || 4.8 || 0.8 || 1.0 || 0.2 || 1.5 || 7.7

Playoffs

|-
| style="text-align:left;"|1999
| style="text-align:left;"|Sacramento
| 1 || 1 || 24.0 || .000 || .000 || .500 || 10.0 || 0.0 || 1.0 || 0.0 || 3.0 || 1.0
|-
| style="text-align:left;"|2000
| style="text-align:left;"|Sacramento
| 2 || 0 || 6.0 || .000 || .000 || .000 || 1.0 || 0.0 || 0.5 || 0.0 || 0.0 || 0.0
|-
| style="text-align:left;background:#afe6ba;"|2001†
| style="text-align:left;"|Los Angeles
| 7 || 0 || 14.6 || .500 || .000 || .643 || 4.0 || 0.3 || 0.4 || 0.6 || 0.7 || 6.4
|-
| style="text-align:left;background:#afe6ba;"|2002†
| style="text-align:left;"|Los Angeles
| 6 || 2 || 21.3 || .633 || .000 || .364 || 4.8 || 0.8 || 1.5 || 0.2 || 1.7 || 7.0
|-
| style="text-align:left;"|Career
| style="text-align:left;"|4 years, 2 teams
| 16 || 3 || 16.6 || .521 || .000 || .519 || 4.3 || 0.4 || 0.9 || 0.3 || 1.1 || 5.5

Notes

External links 
WNBA Player Profile
USA Today sexual assault article
ESPN article on her hopes for returning to the WNBA
ESPN article on her return to the WNBA
http://www.nydailynews.com/archives/sports/battle-sex-byears-lawsuit-outs-wnba-conflict-gay-issue-article-1.650609

1973 births
Living people
All-American college women's basketball players
American expatriate basketball people in Bulgaria
American expatriate basketball people in China
American expatriate basketball people in Greece
American expatriate basketball people in Italy
American expatriate basketball people in Poland
American expatriate basketball people in Turkey
American women's basketball players
Basketball players from Memphis, Tennessee
DePaul Blue Demons women's basketball players
Houston Comets players
Jiangsu Phoenix players
Lesbian sportswomen
LGBT basketball players
LGBT people from Tennessee
American LGBT sportspeople
Los Angeles Sparks players
Northeastern Oklahoma A&M Lady Norse basketball players
People from Millington, Tennessee
Power forwards (basketball)
Sacramento Monarchs players
Washington Mystics players